The Pharmaceutical Group of the European Union (PGEU) is the European association representing more than 400,000 community pharmacists contributing to the health of over 500 million people throughout Europe. Its members include the European national associations and representative bodies of community pharmacists. 
 
PGEU was founded in 1959 following the first “pharmacy days” meeting held in Milan, Italy. Its mission is to promote the role of the pharmacist as a key health professionals within national health systems, making a dynamic and evolving contribution to improving the health of the communities they serve.

References

External links
 http://www.pgeu.eu/
 http://www.gpue.eu/ (in French)

Pan-European trade and professional organizations
Organizations established in 1959
Pharmacy-related professional associations